This is a list of Southwest Conference champions.

Baseball

Regular season 
Texas (64 titles, 56 outright): 1915, 1916, 1917, 1918, 1919, 1920, 1921, 1922, 1924, 1925, 1926, 1927, 1928, 1929, 1930, 1932, 1935, 1936, 1938, 1939, 1940, 1941, 1943*, 1945, 1946, 1947, 1948, 1949, 1950, 1951*, 1952, 1953*, 1954, 1957, 1958, 1960, 1961, 1962, 1963*, 1965, 1966*, 1967*, 1968, 1969, 1970, 1971, 1972*, 1973, 1974, 1975, 1976,  1979, 1980, 1981, 1982, 1983, 1984, 1985, 1986*, 1987, 1988, 1991, 1992, 1996
Texas A&M (15, 10): 1931, 1934, 1937, 1942, 1943*, 1951*, 1955, 1959, 1964, 1966*, 1977, 1978, 1986*, 1989*, 1993
TCU (7, 3): 1933, 1956, 1963*, 1966*, 1967*, 1972*, 1994
Baylor (2, 1): 1923, 1966*
Arkansas (2, 1): 1989*, 1990
Texas Tech (1, 1): 1995
SMU (1, 0): 1953*

* – Denotes shared title

Notes: No official champion in 1944 due to World War II.

Tiebreakers:
1943 – Texas and Texas A&M tied with a 2-2 record against each other.
1951 – Texas A&M advanced to NCAA tournament based on 2-1 record against Texas.
1953 – Texas advanced to NCAA tournament based on 2-1 record against SMU.
1963 – Texas advanced to NCAA tournament based on 2-1 record against TCU.
1966 – Texas advanced to NCAA tournament based on coin flip amongst Texas, Texas A&M, Baylor, and TCU.
1967 – Texas advanced to NCAA tournament based on 2-1 record against TCU.
1972 – Texas advanced to NCAA tournament based on 2-1 record against TCU.
1986 – Texas advanced to NCAA tournament based on 3-0 record against Texas A&M.

Tournament champions 

Texas (11 titles): 1979, 1980, 1981, 1982, 1983, 1984, 1987, 1988, 1990, 1991, 1994
Baylor (3) 1977, 1978, 1993
Texas A&M (2): 1986, 1989
Arkansas (1): 1985
Texas Tech (1): 1995
Rice (1): 1996

Notes: Tournament started in 1977.  No tournament in 1992.

Tournament Hosts:
Austin, Texas (Texas): 1977, 1978, 1979, 1981, 1983, 1984, 1987, 1990, 1993, 1994
College Station, Texas (Texas A&M): 1980, 1982, 1986, 1989, 1991, 1995
Fayetteville, Arkansas (Arkansas): 1985, 1988
Lubbock, Texas (Texas Tech): 1996

Additional references:

Basketball

Men's

Regular season
Arkansas (22 titles, 14 outright): 1926, 1927, 1928, 1929, 1930, 1935*, 1936, 1938, 1941, 1942*, 1944*, 1949*, 1950*, 1958*, 1977, 1978*, 1979*, 1981, 1982, 1989, 1990, 1991
Texas (22, 12): 1915, 1916, 1917, 1919, 1924, 1933, 1939, 1943*, 1947, 1951*, 1954*, 1960, 1963, 1965*, 1972*, 1974, 1978*, 1979*, 1986*, 1992*, 1994, 1995*
SMU (13, 8): 1935*, 1937, 1955, 1956, 1957, 1958*, 1962*, 1965*, 1966, 1967, 1972*, 1988, 1993
Texas A&M (11, 9): 1920, 1921, 1922, 1923, 1951*, 1964, 1969, 1975, 1976, 1980, 1986*
TCU (10, 8): 1931, 1934, 1951*, 1952, 1953, 1959, 1968, 1971, 1986*, 1987
Rice (10, 4): 1918, 1935*, 1940, 1942*, 1943*, 1944*, 1945, 1949*, 1954*, 1970
Texas Tech (6, 4): 1961, 1962*, 1973, 1985, 1995*, 1996
Baylor (5, 3): 1932, 1946, 1948, 1949*, 1950*
Houston (3, 2): 1983, 1984, 1992*
Oklahoma State (1, 1): 1925 – as Oklahoma A&M
* – Denotes shared title

Tournament champions
Arkansas (6 titles): 1977, 1979, 1982, 1989, 1990, 1991
Texas Tech (5): 1976, 1985, 1986, 1993, 1996
Houston (5): 1978, 1981, 1983, 1984, 1992
Texas (2): 1994, 1995
Texas A&M (2): 1980, 1987
SMU (1): 1988

Additional reference:

Women's

Regular season champions

Tournament champions

Cross country

Men's
Texas (33 titles, 32 outright): 1920, 1923, 1924, 1930, 1931, 1932, 1933*, 1934, 1935, 1936, 1937, 1938, 1939, 1940, 1941, 1942, 1943, 1944, 1945, 1946, 1947, 1954, 1955, 1960, 1963, 1964, 1965, 1967, 1969, 1972, 1973, 1991, 1993
Arkansas (23, 23): 1951, 1956, 1957, 1958, 1959, 1966, 1974, 1975, 1976, 1977, 1978, 1979, 1980, 1981, 1982, 1983, 1984, 1985, 1986, 1987, 1988, 1989, 1990
Texas A&M (13, 11): 1922, 1925, 1927, 1928*, 1929, 1933*, 1948, 1949, 1950, 1952, 1953, 1961, 1962
SMU (4, 4): 1968, 1970, 1971, 1995
Baylor (2, 2): 1992, 1994
Rice (2, 1): 1926, 1928*
Oklahoma State (1, 1): 1921 – as Oklahoma A&M

Women's
Baylor (4 titles, 4 outright): 1990, 1991, 1992, 1993
Texas (4, 3): 1985*, 1986 1987, 1989
Houston (4, 3): 1982, 1983, 1984, 1985*
SMU (1, 1): 1995
Rice (1, 1): 1994
Arkansas (1, 1): 1988

Fencing (Men's)
Texas (5): 1942, 1943, 1947, 1948, 1949
Rice (3): 1950, 1951, 1956
Baylor (3): 1939, 1940, 1941
Texas A&M (3): 1952, 1954, 1955
SMU (1): 1938

Competition was held every year beginning in 1938 and ending in  1956 except between 1944–1946 and 1953.

Football

Texas (27 titles, 19 outright): 1916, 1918, 1920, 1928, 1930, 1942, 1943, 1945, 1950, 1952, 1953*, 1959*, 1961*, 1962, 1963, 1968*, 1969, 1970, 1971, 1972, 1973, 1975*, 1977, 1983, 1990, 1994*, 1995
Texas A&M (17, 15): 1917, 1919, 1921, 1925, 1927, 1939, 1940*, 1941, 1956, 1967, 1975*, 1985, 1986, 1987, 1991, 1992, 1993
Arkansas (14, 7): 1933, 1936, 1946*, 1954, 1959*, 1960, 1961*, 1964, 1965, 1968*, 1975*, 1979*, 1988, 1989
SMU (11, 9): 1923, 1926, 1931, 1935, 1940*, 1947, 1948, 1966, 1981, 1982, 1984*
TCU (9, 7): 1929, 1932, 1938, 1944, 1951, 1955, 1958, 1959*, 1994*
Baylor (7, 5): 1915*, 1916, 1922, 1924, 1974, 1980, 1994*
Rice (7, 4): 1934, 1937, 1946*, 1949, 1953*, 1957, 1994*
Houston (4, 1): 1976*, 1978, 1979*, 1984*
Texas Tech (2, 0): 1976*, 1994*
Oklahoma (1, 0): 1915*, 
* – Denotes shared title

Notes:
Baylor forfeited its claim to a share of the 1915 title due to use of an ineligible player.
Arkansas forfeited its claim to the 1933 title due to use of an ineligible player. No champion was named.
No champions were named in 1916 and 1918.  Baylor and Texas both finished the 1916 season tied for the best record.

In 1994, Texas A&M would have won the Southwest Conference title with a 6–0–1 record, but they were ruled ineligible for the conference title and postseason play due to NCAA sanctions. As such, the five teams which finished behind A&M with the same conference record of 4–3 were recognized as co-champions.

Golf

Men's
Texas (39 titles, 37 outright): 1927, 1928, 1932, 1933, 1934, 1935, 1936, 1937, 1938, 1940, 1941, 1942, 1943, 1944, 1945, 1946, 1947, 1949, 1950, 1951, 1952, 1954, 1964, 1965, 1968, 1970, 1972, 1973, 1974*, 1975*, 1981, 1983, 1989, 1990, 1991, 1992, 1993, 1994, 1995
Texas A&M (10, 10): 1926, 1948, 1960, 1961, 1962, 1963, 1967, 1969, 1982, 1987
Houston (9, 7): 1974*, 1975*, 1976, 1977, 1978, 1979, 1980, 1984, 1985
SMU (5, 5): 1931, 1953, 1955, 1956, 1988
Texas Tech (3, 3): 1959, 1971, 1996
Rice (3, 3): 1929, 1930, 1939
Baylor (2, 2): 1957, 1966
TCU (1, 1): 1986
Arkansas (1, 1): 1958
* – Denotes shared title

Women's

Texas (10 titles): 1984, 1987, 1988, 1989, 1990, 1991, 1993, 1994, 1995, 1996
SMU (2): 1986, 1992
Texas A&M (1): 1985
TCU (1): 1983

Soccer

Men's
TCU (2 titles): 1983, 1984

Women's
SMU (1 title): 1995

Swimming and diving

Men's

Texas (38 titles, 37 outright): 1932, 1933, 1934, 1935, 1936, 1937, 1938, 1939, 1940, 1941, 1942, 1943, 1944*, 1946, 1947, 1948, 1949, 1950, 1951, 1952, 1955, 1980, 1981, 1982, 1983, 1984, 1985, 1986, 1987, 1988, 1989, 1990, 1991, 1992, 1993, 1994, 1995, 1996
SMU (25, 25): 1953, 1954, 1957, 1958, 1959, 1960, 1961, 1962, 1963, 1964, 1965, 1966, 1967, 1968, 1969, 1970, 1971, 1972, 1973, 1974, 1975, 1976, 1977, 1978, 1979
Texas A&M (3, 2): 1944*, 1945, 1956
* – Denotes shared title

Women's

Texas (14 titles): 1983, 1984, 1985, 1986 1987, 1988, 1989, 1990, 1991, 1992, 1993, 1994, 1995, 1996

Tennis

Men's

Texas (14 titles, 13 outright): 1951, 1952, 1953, 1954, 1955, 1956, 1957, 1961, 1963, 1967, 1990, 1993, 1994*, 1995
Rice (11, 11): 1958, 1959, 1962, 1964, 1965, 1966, 1968, 1969, 1970, 1971, 1972
SMU (11, 11): 1960, 1973, 1975, 1977, 1978, 1979, 1982, 1983, 1985, 1986, 1987
Arkansas (5, 4): 1980, 1981, 1984, 1988, 1989*
TCU (5, 3): 1989*, 1991, 1992, 1994*, 1996
Houston (2, 2): 1974, 1976
Texas A&M (1, 0): 1994*

Men's tournament
TCU (7): 1988, 1989, 1991, 1992, 1994, 1995 1996
Texas (2): 1990, 1993

Women's

Texas (12 titles, 11 outright): 1983, 1984, 1985, 1987, 1988*, 1989, 1990, 1992, 1993, 1994, 1995, 1996
SMU (1, 0): 1988*
Texas A&M (1, 1): 1986

Women's tournament
Texas (9): 1988, 1989, 1990, 1991, 1992, 1993, 1994, 1995, 1996

* – Denotes shared title

Track and field

Men's outdoor

Texas (45 titles): 1915, 1916, 1920, 1923, 1924, 1925, 1926, 1927, 1932, 1933, 1934, 1935, 1936, 1937, 1940, 1941, 1942, 1944, 1945, 1946, 1950, 1954, 1955, 1956, 1957, 1958, 1959, 1961, 1966, 1968, 1969, 1972, 1973, 1974, 1975, 1976, 1977, 1979, 1986, 1987, 1992, 1993, 1994, 1995, 1996
Texas A&M (15): 1921, 1922, 1929, 1930, 1943, 1947, 1948, 1949, 1951, 1952, 1953, 1970, 1978, 1980, 1981
Arkansas (8): 1982, 1983, 1984, 1985, 1988, 1989, 1990, 1991
Rice (8): 1928, 1931, 1938, 1939, 1964, 1965, 1967, 1971
Baylor (3): 1960, 1962, 1963
Oklahoma (2): 1918, 1919

Note: No competition was held in 1917

Men's indoor
Arkansas (12 titles): 1979, 1981, 1982, 1983, 1984, 1985, 1986, 1987, 1988, 1989, 1990, 1991
Texas (5): 1974, 1975, 1992, 1993, 1994
Baylor (2): 1976, 1996
Houston (2): 1977, 1978
Rice (1): 1995
Texas A&M (1): 1980

Women's outdoor

Texas (11 titles): 1985, 1986, 1987, 1988, 1989, 1991, 1992, 1993, 1994, 1995, 1996
Houston (3): 1983, 1984, 1990

Women's indoor
Texas (12 titles): 1985, 1986, 1987*, 1988, 1989, 1990, 1991, 1992, 1993, 1994, 1995 1996
Houston (3): 1983, 1984, 1987*

Volleyball (women's)

Regular season
Texas (13 titles): 1982, 1983, 1984, 1985, 1986, 1987, 1988, 1989, 1990, 1991, 1992, 1993, 1995
Houston (1): 1994

Tournament champions
Texas (3 titles): 1992, 1993, 1995
Houston (1): 1994

Wrestling
Oklahoma State (6 titles): 1917, 1921, 1922, 1923, 1924, 1925 – as Oklahoma A&M

See also
 List of Big 12 Conference champions

References

Southwest Conference
Champions